Zvolen is a town in central Slovakia, situated on the confluence of Hron and Slatina rivers, close to Banská Bystrica. It is surrounded by Poľana mountain from the East, by Kremnické vrchy from the West and by Javorie and Štiavnické vrchy from the South.

Zvolen is a seat of a county (Zvolen District). It is also an important transportation hub in Slovakia.

Etymology
The name is of Slovak (Slavic) origin meaning "the chosen one, splendid, excellent". The Hungarian  and the German  were derived from the Latinized form  (earliest mention 1135). An adjective "Old" distinguish Zvolen from Banská Bystrica.

History
Zvolen has been inhabited since the Paleolithic. In the ninth century, a Slavic settlement (today the Môťová neighborhood) became a regional center of what is now central Slovakia. Zvolen remained the capital of Zólyom County until the 1760s. In the 11th and 12th centuries, one of the largest medieval castles in Europe, Pustý hrad, was constructed. The town, originally built under the castle, lay on an important trade route (Via Magna) from Buda to Kraków. Zvolen was granted town privileges by King Béla IV in the 1230s - as one of the first towns in the Kingdom of Hungary. The privileges were confirmed on 28 December 1243, after the original document was destroyed in war. Later, King Louis I the Great built a new castle, which became a popular hunting resort of the Hungarian kings. The future queen regnant Mary of Hungary and emperor Sigismund celebrated their wedding there in 1385.

In the Rákóczi's War of Independence the Kuruc army in the battle of Zvolen defeated the enemy forces from Austria, Denmark, Vojvodina and Hungary.

In 1848–49, Ľudovít Štúr was a member of the Diet, with Zvolen as his constituency. In 1871–1872, two new railways were built and Zvolen became an important railroad hub and important industrial center. Zvolen played an important role during the Slovak National Uprising. Two of its armored trains, which were made in the local railway manufactory, Hurban and Štefánik can be seen near the Zvolen castle.

Zvolen is an important railroad, an important road hub and has a large timber factory and a technical university, the Technická univerzita vo Zvolene. An airport in nearby Sliač offers direct flights to Prague. The town square was modernized in 2002 and local businesses are popular with tourists. In wintertime an ice rink is constructed in the center and festive celebrations run throughout December.

Demographics
Zvolen has a population of  43,147 (as of 31 December 2005). According to the 2001 census, 95.9% of inhabitants were Slovaks and 1.2% Czechs. The religious make-up was 52.5% Roman Catholics, 26.4% people with no religious affiliation, and 15% Lutherans.

Sport
The local ice hockey team HKm Zvolen plays in the Slovak Extraliga.

Notable people
 Bálint Balassi, poet and nobleman
 Karol Beck, tennis player
 Jozef Cíger-Hronský, writer
 Ján Lašák, ice hockey player
 Vladimír Maňka, politician
 Vladimír Mečiar, politician
 František Velecký, actor
Ľudovít Štúr, politician, linguist, writer

Twin towns — sister cities

Zvolen is a member of the Douzelage, a town twinning association of towns across the European Union. This active town twinning began in 1991 and there are regular events, such as a produce market from each of the other countries and festivals. As of 2019, its members are:

 Agros, Cyprus
 Altea, Spain
 Asikkala, Finland
 Bad Kötzting, Germany
 Bellagio, Italy
 Bundoran, Ireland
 Chojna, Poland
 Granville, France
 Holstebro, Denmark
 Houffalize, Belgium
 Judenburg, Austria
 Kőszeg, Hungary
 Marsaskala, Malta
 Meerssen, Netherlands
 Niederanven, Luxembourg
 Oxelösund, Sweden
 Preveza, Greece
 Rokiškis, Lithuania
 Rovinj, Croatia
 Sesimbra, Portugal
 Sherborne, England, United Kingdom
 Sigulda, Latvia
 Siret, Romania
 Škofja Loka, Slovenia
 Sušice, Czech Republic
 Tryavna, Bulgaria
 Türi, Estonia

Other twinnings

 Imatra, Finland
 Zwoleń, Poland
 Prachatice, Czech Republic
 Tótkomlós, Hungary
 Rivne, Ukraine

Gallery

References

External links

Official municipal website of Zvolen
Technical University in Zvolen

 
Cities and towns in Slovakia